The 2009 World Rowing Championships were World Rowing Championships that were held from 23 to 30 August 2009 at Lake Malta, Poznań, Poland. The annual week-long rowing regatta was organized by FISA (the International Rowing Federation), and held at the end of the northern hemisphere summer. In non-Olympic years it is the highlight of the international rowing calendar.

Medal summary

Men's events
 Non-Olympic classes

Women's events
 Non-Olympic classes

Adaptive events
 Non-Paralympic classes

Medal table

Men's and women's events

Adaptive events

References

External links
 Official website
 Schedule

World Rowing Championships
Rowing competitions in Poland
World Rowing Championships
Rowing
Sport in Poznań
21st century in Poznań
2009 in Polish sport
Rowing